The Fieseler F2 Tiger was a German single-seat aerobatic biplane which was flown to victory in the 1934 World Aerobatics Competition (WAC) by its designer/builder Gerhard Fieseler.

Design and development

Gerhard Fieseler started his own company in 1930 in the former Segelflugzeugbau company at Kassel, Germany. Fieseler was a World War I German fighter ace with almost 20 kills to his credit, and became a world class competition aerobatic pilot. To compete in International competitions Fieseler designed and built the Fieseler F2 Tiger single-seat biplane, powered by a  Walter Pollux II air-cooled 9-cylinder radial.

The 1934 World Aerobatics Competition, held in Paris, was the first of its kind, and, despite the deaths of two pilots and a few crashes, the competition continued and Fieseler won, although he went over the time limit due to a loose harness, beating his nearest competitor, Michel Detroyat of France (who flew an M.S.225), by 23 points (645.2 to 622.9). Fieseler retired from the sport with his victory.

The F2 Tiger itself would form the basis for later aircraft, including the Fieseler F5. It was built by Fieseler's own aircraft company, Fieseler Flugzeugbau (later, Gerhard Fieseler Werke). The F2 served as both an important forerunner of later German aircraft which would go on to fight for the Third Reich in WWII, and as a famous piece of inter-war aircraft design, as well as being the winning aircraft of the first WAC.

Specifications

See also 

List of aircraft of the WW2 Luftwaffe
Aerobatics

Biplanes
Single-engined tractor aircraft
1930s German sport aircraft
F002
Aerobatic aircraft
Aircraft first flown in 1932